European Women's Championship  may refer to:

 UEFA Women's Championship, in association football
 Rugby Europe Women's Championship, in rugby union
 Women's European Cricket Championship
 Women's European Volleyball Championship
 Women's Softball European Championship

Basketball
 FIBA U16 Women's European Championship
 FIBA U18 Women's European Championship
 FIBA U20 Women's European Championship

Handball
 European Women's Handball Championship
 European Women's U-19 European Handball Championship

See also
 European Championship